Williamston is the name of several places in the United States of America:
Williamston, Michigan
Williamston, North Carolina
Williamston, South Carolina